The 2021 NWSL Challenge Cup was a league cup tournament that took place during the 2021 National Women's Soccer League season. It began on April 9 and ended May 8, one week before the start of the regular season. It was the second iteration of the NWSL Challenge Cup tournament, which had started in 2020 in response to the COVID-19 pandemic and was announced as a regular event later in 2020. Portland Thorns FC won the 2021 final over NJ/NY Gotham FC in a penalty shootout.

Format 
While the inaugural Challenge Cup took place entirely in a single "bubble" location during the COVID-19 pandemic, the 2021 Challenge Cup was played in home markets. The 10 NWSL teams were organized into two regional divisions of five teams each. Every team played four games within their division, with the two division winners competing in the final on May 8.

The full schedule was released on March 9, 2021, along with tournament rules and regulations.

Tiebreakers 
The initial determining factor for a team's position in the standings was most points earned, with three points earned for a win, one point for a draw, and zero points for a loss. If two or more teams were equal on points after completion of the preliminary round, the following criteria were applied to determine team rankings:

 Superior goal difference in all divisional matches.
 Greatest number of goals scored in all divisional matches.
 Lowest team conduct score relating to the number of yellow and red cards obtained, where only one of the below point totals shall be applied to a player in a single match:
 yellow card: 1 point;
 indirect red card (as a result of two yellow cards): 3 points;
 direct red card: 4 points;
 yellow card and direct red card: 5 points.
 Drawing of lots by the NWSL.

Final 
The final was hosted by the team with the best record across both divisions. The final was 90 minutes; in the event it was tied, teams would proceed directly to a penalty shootout with no overtime periods.

East Division

Standings

Games

West Division

Standings

Games

Championship 
Portland Thorns FC won the right to host the final by finishing with the best record across both divisions. The game finished in a 1-1 draw after the regulation 90 minutes, so it proceeded to a penalty shootout. Each team missed one penalty kick during the first five rounds, both hitting a shot off the crossbar. In the seventh round, Gotham FC, shooting first, had a shot saved by Portland goalkeeper Adrianna Franch, and Morgan Weaver converted Portland's try to win the tournament.

Statistics

Goalscorers 
Statistics do not include penalty-shootout goals.

Discipline 
A player would be automatically suspended for the next match in the tournament for the following offenses:
 Receiving a red card (red card suspensions may be extended for serious offenses);
 Receiving two yellow cards in two matches, unless the second yellow card was accumulated in the final match of divisional play;
 Only direct red card suspensions would be carried over to the NWSL regular season.

The following suspensions were served during the tournament:

Awards 
Debinha of the North Carolina Courage was voted the tournament's Most Valuable Player. DiDi Haracic (NJ/NY Gotham FC) and Christine Sinclair (Portland Thorns FC), whose teams faced off in the final, were the other two MVP finalists.

Adrianna Franch of the Portland Thorns was voted the MVP of the championship game. She was also named NWSL Player of the Week for her play in the championship game.

Weekly awards

Broadcasting 
NWSL's broadcasting partnership with CBS Sports and Twitch continued. In the US, CBS Sports Network (CBSSN) aired the opener, a rematch of the 2020 NWSL Challenge Cup Championship between Houston Dash and Chicago Red Stars, on April 9, as well as three additional games; the final game on May 8 was available on CBS and Paramount+; and all other games were streamed exclusively on Paramount+. Every game was available on Twitch internationally, including in Canada when games were not on CBS Sports Network.

JP Dellacamera and Aly Wagner commentated on the opening game and the final, while Jenn Hildreth and Lori Lindsey provided commentary in three other games on CBSSN. Marisa Pilla returned to the coverage as sideline reporter. Commentators for Paramount+ and Twitch coverage included play-by-play announcers Mike Watts, Jordan Angeli, Josh Eastern, Joe Malfa and Josh Tolle, and match analyst Lori Lindsey, Jen Cooper, Kaylyn Kyle, Lisa Roman and Kacey White.

References

External links 

2021
2021 in American soccer leagues
2021 National Women's Soccer League season
NWSL